Pinghua  is a pair of Sinitic languages spoken mainly in parts of the Guangxi, with some speakers in Hunan. Pinghua is a trade language in some areas of Guangxi, where it is spoken as a second language by speakers of Zhuang languages. Some speakers are officially classified as Zhuang, and many are genetically distinct from most other Han Chinese. The northern subgroup is centered on Guilin and the southern subgroup around Nanning. The Southern dialect has several notable features such as having four distinct checked tones, and using various loanwords from the Zhuang languages, such as the final particle wei for imperative sentences.

Classification
Language surveys in Guangxi during the 1950s recorded varieties of Chinese that had been included in the Yue dialect group but were different from those in Guangdong. Pinghua was designated as a separate dialect group from Yue by the Chinese Academy of Social Sciences in the 1980s and since then has been treated as a separate dialect in textbooks and surveys.  

Since designation as a separate dialect group, Pinghua has been the focus of increased research. In 2008 a report by the Chinese Academy of Social Sciences of research into Chinese varieties noted an increase in research papers and surveys of Pinghua, from 7 before the 1987 publication of the Language Atlas of China based on the revised classification, and about 156 between then and 2004.

In the 1980s the number of speakers was listed as over 2 million; and by 2016 as 7 million.

Dialects
Pinghua is divided into two mutually unintelligible languages:
 The Northern Pinghua (Guìběi ) is spoken in northern Guangxi, around the city of Guilin, in close proximity with Southwest Mandarin dialects.
and also in a some places in Hunan, such as Tongdao.
Younian dialect (ethnically Yao)
 The Southern Pinghua (Guìnán ) is spoken in southern Guangxi, around the city of Nanning.  These varieties form a dialect continuum with Yue varieties spoken in that part of Guangxi (excluding enclaves of Cantonese, such as in Nanning). Yu Jin subdivides this group into three types:
 Yongjiang, spoken along the Yong River around Nanning.
 Guandao (官道 "official road"), spoken to the east of Nanning in Laibin and the counties of Heng and Binyang, around the road to the Southwest Mandarin-speaking city of Liuzhou.
 Rongjiang, spoken along the Rong River to the north of Liuzhou.

Phonology
This is unlike Standard Cantonese but like some other Yue varieties such as Taishanese.

Tones
Southern Pinghua has six contrasting tones in open syllables, and four in checked syllables, as found in neighbouring Yue varieties such as the Bobai dialect.

The split of the lower entering tone is determined by the initial consonant, with the low rising contour occurring after sonorant initials.

Anthropological
Genetically, Pinghua speakers have more in common with non-Han ethnic minorities in southern China than with other Han groups.

References

Further reading
Xie Jianyou [谢建猷], et al. 2007. Studies on the Han Chinese dialects of Guangxi [广西汉语方言研究]. Nanning: Guangxi People's Publishing House [广西人民出版社].
《广西通志·汉语方言志》(续编)课题组 (2013). 广西通志·汉语方言志：续编．第二篇，平话. Nanning: 广西人民出版社.
《广西通志·汉语方言志》(续编)课题组 (2013). 广西通志·汉语方言志：续编．第五篇，桂北土话. Nanning: 广西人民出版社.

External links
 Classification of Pinghua Dialects

Varieties of Chinese
Languages of China
Culture in Guangxi